Cameron Shahbazi (born 1992) is a Persian-Canadian operatic countertenor who has performed leading roles at opera houses and festivals in Europe, performing both Baroque and contemporary opera.

Career 
Shahbazi was born in Hamilton, Ontario, in 1992. He studied singing first at the University of Toronto. He made his stage debut in the title role of Francesco Cavalli's Giasone at the Hamilton Opera, a role he repeated at the San Diego Opera in 2017. Shahbazi studied further at the Conservatorium van Amsterdam with Sasja Hunnego, and was a member of the opera studio of the Dutch National Opera.

A reviewer noted his charm and stage presence, and a broad spectrum of tone colors. He received a Kiri Te Kanawa Foundation Cover Award in the 2019/20 season, to cover the role of Narciso in Handel's Agrippina at the Royal Opera House in London. In December 2020, he appeared in two roles in a production of George Benjamin's Written on Skin at the Cologne Opera. A reviewer praised his performance as ranging from "angelic elegance to Luciferian charm", and called his voice "iridescent". He was awarded the 2021 Walter Prystawski Prize of the Sylva Gelber Foundation.

In 2022, he appeared in the title role of Handel's Tolomeo at the Karlsruhe Handel Festival. At the Oper Frankfurt, he performed as Oberon in Britten's A Midsummer Night’s Dream in 2022, staged at the Bockenheimer Depot by Brigitte Fassbaender. A reviewer described his voice as "mysteriously aloof-sounding" ("der geheimnisvoll unnahbar klingenden Stimme") and noted that he and the Tytania of Kateryna Kasper were a couple "not of this world" ("nicht von dieser Welt"). In 2023, Shahbazi sang the role of Tolomeo in the Dutch National Opera's production of Giulio Cesare.

References

External links 
 
 

1992 births
Living people
University of Toronto alumni
Conservatorium van Amsterdam alumni
Countertenors
Musicians from Hamilton, Ontario
21st-century Canadian male opera singers